The Moeszinger-Marquis Hardware Co. is an historic building located in Clinton, Iowa, United States.   The three-story brick warehouse building was an addition to the original building to the north, which has subsequently been demolished.  Clinton architect Josiah L. Rice designed the building in the Romanesque Revival style.  The C.E. Armstrong and Company, which was a wholesaler of hardware, plumbing, heating, and mill supplies occupied the building in 1932.  It was listed on the National Register of Historic Places in 2006.

References

Industrial buildings completed in 1898
Buildings and structures in Clinton, Iowa
Industrial buildings and structures on the National Register of Historic Places in Iowa
National Register of Historic Places in Clinton County, Iowa
Romanesque Revival architecture in Iowa